Magdalena Filiks (born 8 December 1978) is a Polish politician. She was elected to the Sejm (9th term) representing the constituency of Szczecin.

Suicide of Mikolaj Filiks

Her son Mikolaj, aged 15, killed himself in February 2023 after Radio Szczecin, part of the state-run broadcaster Polskie Radio network, released a report that led to his identification as a victim of pedophile. In an ensuing controversy, the ruling Law and Justice Party was accused by the opposition of releasing the report to obtain political gain as the convicted man was a former Civic Platform member, election candidate, and an LGBT activist. Law and Justice supporters in turn have responded with accusations that the Civic Platform deliberately covered up the conviction and that the suicide was being used by the opposition for political gain. Poland's National Broadcasting Council launched an inquiry to examine if the broadcast endangered the child's welfare.

References 

1978 births
Living people
Place of birth missing (living people)
21st-century Polish politicians
21st-century Polish women politicians
Members of the Polish Sejm 2019–2023
Women members of the Sejm of the Republic of Poland
Civic Platform politicians